Herbert Taylor may refer to:

Herbert Taylor (British Army officer) (1775–1839), British general and politician                    
Herbert Taylor (Australian politician) (1885–1970), Australian political party organiser
Herb Taylor (American football) (born 1984), football player
Herbert J. Taylor (1893–1978), American Rotarian
Herbie Taylor (1889–1973), South African cricketer
Herbert Taylor (English cricketer) (1910–93)
Herbert Taylor (speed skater) (1906–1981), American Olympic speed skater
Herbert Taylor (swimmer) (1892–1965), American swimmer and water polo player 
Herbert Hudson Taylor (1861–1950), British Protestant Christian missionary to China
Herbert W. Taylor (1869–1931), American Republican Party politician
J. Herbert Taylor, American molecular biologist and geneticist

See also
Bert Taylor (disambiguation)